is a railway station on the privately operated Chōshi Electric Railway Line in Chōshi, Chiba, Japan.

Lines

Station layout
The station consists of one side platform serving a single track. The station building was rebuilt in December 1991 to resemble a Swiss mountain railway station. The station is staffed, and, until March 2017, included a shop which baked taiyaki cakes.

History
The railway closed in November 1917, but was reopened on 5 July 1923 as the Chōshi Railway. In 1925, the station was moved to its current location, further away from Nakanochō Station.

The taiyaki cake shop inside the station was scheduled to close at the end of March 2017, over 40 years after it opened in 1976.

Passenger statistics
In fiscal 2010, the station was used by an average of 108 passengers daily (boarding passengers only). The passenger figures for past years are as shown below.

Surrounding area
 Enpuku-ji temple
 Chōshi Municipal Sports Centre
 Chiba Prefectural Choshi High School

See also
 List of railway stations in Japan

References

External links

  

Stations of Chōshi Electric Railway Line
Railway stations in Chiba Prefecture
Railway stations in Japan opened in 1913